Alden B. Dow Home and Studio, also known as Alden B. Dow Home & Studio, in Midland, Michigan, is the home and studio that were the residence and acknowledged masterpiece of 20th century architect Alden B. Dow. The quality and originality of his work, as well as his association with Frank Lloyd Wright, have earned him lasting national recognition.

Construction for the first studio began in 1934, while the majority of the United States was struggling through the Great Depression. With the Dow Chemical Company located in Midland Michigan, the community had not been hit as hard as the rest of the country. Being that Alden was a child of the Dow Chemical founder, Herbert H. Dow, he had many opportunities within Midland to practice architecture. The first studio was completed in 1935 and construction for the second studio began in 1936. The second studio was completed in 1937. The studio was created as a workplace for Alden's architectural firm. As well as the two drafting rooms, there was also an entry and reception area and the sunken conference room, which sits below water level. The pond was created by diverting the stream that ran through the property. The studio portion also had a woodshop, an office and Alden's office which was the buffer between the studio and home. The woodshop has been turned into a museum with a gift shop.

Dow built his home and studio between 1937 and 1940. Throughout the home there are visible construction materials including the building blocks that were patented in 1935, "Unit Blocks".  Alden Dow's exploration of block construction began after graduating from the Columbia School of Architecture in 1931 and an eight-month apprenticeship at Taliesin in 1933. Alden Dow, along with Robert Goodall, one of Frank Lloyd Wright's draftsman, created a rhomboid block, mostly with a square face in 16 different sizes. This became known as Alden B. Dow's Unit Block building system. Dow used them to form walls and terraces, as well as decoration elements such as the stepping stones in the surrounding pond on the property. In addition to the unique shape and structural integrity of the building blocks, the other identifying characteristic of the Unit Blocks was that they were made of the cinder that he saw piling up outside The Dow Chemical Company furnaces.  His father, Herbert Dow, had utilized this same cinder waste to construct “clinker” bridges in their family gardens (now, Dow Gardens).

It was declared a National Historic Landmark in 1989.

It was awarded the Paris Prize for Residential Architecture in 1937.

The house is open to the public for tours and abuts the Dow Gardens.

Traditional Home magazine listed the Alden B. Dow Home and Studio on a 2014 list of "The 25 Best Historic Homes in America", Great Estates:  A new look at historic house museums

See also
List of National Historic Landmarks in Michigan
National Register of Historic Places listings in Midland County, Michigan

References

External links
Alden B. Dow Home & Studio official site

National Historic Landmarks in Michigan
National Register of Historic Places in Midland County, Michigan
Midland, Michigan
Houses in Midland County, Michigan
Houses completed in 1936
Historic house museums in Michigan
Artists' studios in the United States
Museums in Midland County, Michigan
Architecture museums in the United States
Alden B. Dow buildings